Canker-worm may refer to following  inchworms:

 Alsophila pometaria, the fall cankerworm 
 Paleacrita vernata, the spring cankerworm

Animal common name disambiguation pages